The 1872 United States presidential election in Missouri took place on November 5, 1872, as part of the 1872 United States presidential election. Voters chose 15 representatives, or electors to the Electoral College, who voted for president and vice president.

Missouri voted for the Liberal Republican candidate, Horace Greeley, over Republican candidate, Ulysses S. Grant. Greeley won Missouri by a margin of 11.81%, but died prior to the Electoral College meeting, allowing Missouri's fifteen electors to vote for the candidate of their choice.

Results

See also
 United States presidential elections in Missouri

Footnotes

References

Missouri
1872
1872 Missouri elections